Karposhtli may refer to:
 Karposhtli-ye Baghi
 Karposhtli-ye Olya